William Keatinge  (1 August 1869 – 21 February 1934) was an English prelate of the Roman Catholic Church. He served as Chaplain to the Forces, 1st Class, arriving in France 18 August 1914 and was Bishop of the Forces from 1917 to 1934.  He was awarded the Military Cross in the 1915 Birthday Honours.

Born in London on 1 August 1869, he was ordained to the priesthood on 27 May 1893. He was appointed the Bishop of the Forces and Titular Bishop of Metellopolis by the Holy See on 30 October 1917. His consecration to the Episcopate took place on 25 February 1918, the principal consecrator was Cardinal Gaetano de Lai,  and the principal co-consecrators were Archbishop Giuseppe Palica and Bishop Algernon Charles Stanley.

He died in office on 21 February 1934, aged 64.

References

1869 births
1934 deaths
20th-century Roman Catholic bishops in England
Roman Catholic clergy from London
Recipients of the Military Cross
Roman Catholic bishops of the Forces